Mulfachri Harahap (born March 23, 1966, Jakarta) is an Indonesian politician and lawyer. He was elected to the House of Representatives in 2014 representing the Electoral District of North Sumatra I with 47,280 votes. He served in commission 3 in charge of the Law. He is also chairman of the National Mandate Party faction in the House of Representatives of the Republic of Indonesia.

References 

1966 births
Living people
People from Jakarta
Indonesian politicians